Robert Schaefer may refer to:
 Robert Schaefer (footballer) (born 1972), Australian rules footballer
 Robert M. Schaefer (born 1930), American politician in the Washington House of Representatives
 Robert E. Schaefer, American architect and politician in the Idaho House of Representatives
 Bob Schaefer (born 1944), baseball coach and manager

See also
 Robert Shafer (disambiguation)
 Roberto Schaefer, American cinematographer
 Bob Schaffer (born 1962), U.S. Representative from Colorado
 Robert Schäfer, German attorney and football manager